The women's 1000 meter at the 2020 KNSB Dutch Single Distance Championships in Heerenveen took place at Thialf ice skating rink on Sunday 29 December 2019.

Statistics

Result

Source:

Draw

References 

Single Distance Championships
2020 Single Distance
World